Geraldine Schaer Bonnevie-Savellano (formerly Sotto and Penson; January 27, 1962), known by her stage name Dina Bonnevie, is a Filipino actress in the Philippines. She is recognized as the industry's "Drama Queen" of her generation. She has won 2 FAMAS Awards, 2 Luna Awards and multiple 'Best Actress' wins and nominations across all leading award-giving bodies in the country. 

Before joining Philippine showbiz, Bonnevie was first runner-up in the Miss Magnolia 1979 Beauty Contest. She landed her first acting assignment in the campy Temptation Island in 1980 with Joey Gosiengfiao at the helm. Bonnevie is also best-known for her iconic portrayals in Katorse (1980), Under-age (1980), Magdusa Ka! (1986), Ang Babaeng Nawawala sa Sarili (1989), and Gumapang ka sa Lusak (1990).

Early life and background

Bonnevie was born January 27, 1962, to Swiss mother Jeannette Schäer and French-Italian-Filipino father Honesto Bonnevie. Her paternal grandfather was Pedro José de Bonnevie, a significant landowner in the Bicol region, who hails from Évian-les-Bains, France and was part French and Italian. Her grandmother was pre-World War II actress Rosita Rivera, also from Bicol. She is a cousin of singer Lou Bonnevie. She has two children from her previous marriage with comedian Vic Sotto, Oyo Boy Sotto and Danica, both of whom are now in the entertainment industry as well.

She was educated at St. Theresa's College, Manila and finished her elementary and secondary education at St. Agnes' Academy in Legazpi City, where she was very active in drama guilds. In 1979, she was first runner-up in Miss Magnolia contest, where Joanna Paras took home the title.

In 1980 she enrolled in Communication Arts at the Ateneo de Naga University and, later, the University of the Philippines, unfortunately, she did not graduate and finish her degree. Introduced by young actor Alfie Anido to director Joey Gosiengfiao, she first appeared in teen dramas Underage (1980) and Temptation Island (1980), but her breakout movie was Katorse (1980) with Anido and Gabby Concepcion. This film established her as one of the "Regal Babies" (named after the studio, Regal Films). She then appeared in a longer slew of teenage love or growing-pains dramas. Bakit Ba Ganyan? (1981) was a film whose theme song she sang and popularized.

In 1981, she starred in Age Doesn't Matter and was paired with Vic Sotto. What started as a reel romance turned real. The couple started a sitcom from 1982 to 1986 over BBC channel 2 every Saturday at 8 pm entitled, 2 + 2 = Gulo, sharing stellar billing with Maricel Soriano, William Martinez and Herbert Bautista. During this period, she focused on being a homemaker and would occasionally accept showbiz assignments. In-between her domestic life, she was able to finish Mike de Leon's Hindi Nahahati Ang Langit in 1985, lending support to Lorna Tolentino, Elwood Perez' Till We Meet Again and Leroy Salvador's Tinik sa Dibdib, both with Nora Aunor.

In 1986, she was re-launched and re-packaged by Viva Films as a dramatic actress through the comics-adapted story, Magdusa Ka! This time, local award-giving bodies recognized her performance by giving her their highly coveted statuettes.

Acting career
In 1985, she ventured into dramatic roles, starting with Mike de Leon's Hindi Nahahati ang Langit (1985). Her other films are A Dangerous Life (1988) (mini), with American actor Gary Busey; Orapronobis (1989), Pangarap na Ginto (1990), Huwag mong Salingin ang Sugat ko (1991) and Akin ang Pangarap Mo (1992). In Babaeng Nawawala sa Sarili (1989), Bonnevie sizzled and wowed critics and audiences alike in the role of a possessed woman. She also portrayed real-life characters, such as in Eskapo: The Serge Osmena-Geny Lopez Story (1995), as the wife of Geny Lopez; as one of the accused parents in the child-molestation drama, Minsan May Pangarap: The Guce Family Story (1995), shot in New York City; as the girlfriend of activist Leopoldo Mabilangan in Ka Hector (1995); and as Governor Chavit Singson's wife in Chavit (2003), opposite Cesar Montano and Eddie Garcia. She also did some sexy roles in Tag-Araw, Tag-Ulan where she starred with Gary Estrada.

Other notable films where Bonnevie showed maturity as an actress include: Tinik sa Dibdib (1985), for which she won Best Supporting Actress at the Filipino Academy of Movie Arts and Sciences (FAMAS) and Film Academy of the Philippines (FAP) awarding ceremonies; Magdusa Ka (1986), for which she was given Best Actress awards by FAMAS, FAP and Catholic Mass Media Awards; Gumapang ka sa Lusak (1990), directed by Lino Brocka, for which she was nominated by FAMAS and URIAN Awards for Best Actress; and Sa Kabila ng Lahat (1991), for which she was nominated by FAMAS, FAP and Urian Awards for Best Actress.

Other acting nominations are for Kung Kasalanan Man (1989), FAMAS; Bakit Kay Tagal ng Sandali? (1990), FAP; Tanging Yaman (2000), which won Best Picture in nearly all the local awards ceremonies and gave her an URIAN Best Supporting Actress nomination; American Adobo (2001), URIAN Best Actress nomination; and Bridal Shower (2004), URIAN Best Actress nomination again.

Bonnevie also appeared in bright comedies with her former husband, Vic Sotto, in Hindi Pa Tapos Ang Labada, Darling! (1994) and Bakit Ba Ganyan? (Ewan ko nga ba, Darling) (2000). When they were still married they also appeared together in Ride on Baby (1985) and Mama Said, Papa Said, I Love You (1985). Bonnevie also topbilled Tatarin (2001), based on the short story Summer Solstice by Nick Joaquin; critics nearly panned the movie but appreciated Bonnevie's nuanced characterization of Lupe Moreta.

Television career
Bonnevie started in hot soaps such as May Bukas Pa with Viva Television and IBC-13 in 1999–2001. In 2001–2003, she joined GMA Network with the evening soap Ikaw Lang Ang Mamahalin. In 2003–2004, she starred in another drama, Narito Ang Puso Ko and in 2004-2005 she had a lead and recurring role in the critically acclaimed primetime soap opera Hiram, starring Kris Aquino, Mickey Ferriols, Heart Evangelista and Anne Curtis, which also aired internationally through The Filipino Channel earning her praise for her role. From 2005–2006, she was seen less on television. In 2007, she came back with soaps like Walang Kapalit and Natutulog Ba Ang Diyos?. After doing projects with ABS-CBN, she decided to do another "sinenovela", Babangon Ako’t Dudurugin Kita with GMA Network that aired in 2008. In 2009, another soap May Bukas Pa, a religious themed soap (which was the same title as her 2000-2001 soap) and earned her many nominations as the soap ran for a year on television with an ensemble cast. From 2010–2012, she joined TV5 doing multiple guestings and drama shows. From 2013-2015, she was with ABS-CBN to do Bukas Na Lang Kita Mamahalin, Sana Bukas pa ang Kahapon, and Two Wives. Bonnevie staged her GMA-7 comeback as the main antagonist of the drama series starring Heart Evangelista and Lovi Poe, Beautiful Strangers.

In 2017, she came back as a Kapamilya to do The Blood Sisters which aired in 2018. After the show ended, Bonnevie transferred back to GMA Network.

Except for her stints on soap operas and for judging a recent TV talent contest (and appearing unclothed on the cover of the local FHM Magazine), Bonnevie disappeared from the limelight throughout 2005 and 2006; she temporarily moved to the United States for business purposes. She was a guest-judge in U Can Dance Version 2.

Music
Her first and only album Bakit Ba Ganyan, released in 1981 by Octo Arts International (now PolyEast Records formerly EMI Music Philippines, Inc.), became a Gold Record. Before her album, she sang a slapstick comedy ballad "Upakan" with Joey de Leon, recorded live on a primetime TV show in 1980.

Awards

Filmography

Television

Movies

References

External links

1961 births
GMA Network personalities
ABS-CBN personalities
Viva Artists Agency
Living people
Filipino film actresses
Filipino television actresses
Filipino people of French descent
Filipino people of Italian descent
Filipino people of Swiss descent
Bicolano people
Bicolano actors
Filipino women comedians
20th-century Filipino actresses
21st-century Filipino actresses
People from Quezon City
Actresses from Metro Manila